This article is about the phonology of the Latgalian language.

Vowels

 Long  are rare and occur only in interjections. The phonological long counterparts of the short  are the diphthongs .
 There are very few minimal pairs for the  opposition.
  are phonetically central .
Phonemically, they are all sequences of two phonemes, rather than proper diphthongs.

Consonants

Accent

Stress
The stress is most often on the first syllable.

Tonal accents
There are two phonemic tonal accents in Latgalian, which appear only on long syllables, i.e. those with a long vowel, a diphthong, or a sequence of a short vowel and a sonorant. These are falling (also called level) and broken (also called sharp). However, there are only a handful of minimal (or near-minimal) pairs, such as  'swallow' and  'tomorrow', both written reit.

Phonetically, both of the tonal accents are falling; the falling accent is realized as an even decrease in intensity and pitch, whereas the broken accent is realized as a sudden decrease in intensity and pitch.

References

Bibliography

 
 

East Baltic languages
Baltic phonologies